The following is a list of Hopkins School people in alphabetical order. This includes alumni and/or faculty from Hopkins in any of its past forms (Hopkins School, Hopkins Grammar School).

References

Hopkins School
Hopkins School